Arnold Mitchell (1 December 1929 – 19 October 2014) was an English professional footballer who played in the Football League as a right half.

References
General
 
Specific

1929 births
2014 deaths
Footballers from Rotherham
English footballers
Association football wing halves
Derby County F.C. players
Nottingham Forest F.C. players
Notts County F.C. players
Exeter City F.C. players
Taunton Town F.C. players
English Football League players